The Kan, also known as Khalifa, are a Muslim community native to Bangladesh and the Indian state of West Bengal.

Origin
The Kan, a small Muslim community, were traditionally involved in the repairing of umbrellas. According to traditions, the Kan were originally members of the Dom community who converted to Islam. In addition to repairing umbrellas, the community is also involved in the manufacture of fishhooks. The community is found mainly in the districts of  Murshidabad, 24 Parganas and Nadia in West Bengal and Faridpur District in Bangladesh.

Present circumstances
The Kan are still involved in the traditional occupation of umbrella repairing, and during the chaitra or rainy season, the community entirely devotes itself to the construction and repairing umbrellas. This season last for almost six months, while for the remaining six months the community is involved in daily wage labour. A significant numbers of the community are now cultivators. They grow mainly paddy and wheat.

The Kan occupies distinct quarters in villages known as a paras. Each of these settlements contains an informal caste council known as a panchayat, which acts as an instrument of social control. The community are strictly endogamous, and marry close kin.

See also

Domba

References

Dalit Muslim
Social groups of West Bengal
Muslim communities of India
Ethnic groups in Bangladesh
Dom in India
Dom in Bangladesh
Romani in Bangladesh
Romani in India